Tuks Stadium (sometimes referred to as ABSA Tuks Stadium for sponsorship reasons) is a soccer stadium in Hatfield, Pretoria, and the home ground of the University of Pretoria F.C.

References

Sports venues in Pretoria
Soccer venues in South Africa